The 1936 Arizona State Bulldogs football team was an American football team that represented Arizona State Teachers College (later renamed Arizona State University) in the Border Conference during the 1936 college football season. In their fourth season under head coach Rudy Lavik, the Bulldogs compiled a 4–5 record (2–3 against Border opponents) and were outscored by a total of 109 to 83. The team captain was right end John Rouse.  The Bulldogs finished 2-3 at home and 2-2 on the road.  It was the first season during which all home games were played at Goodwin Stadium in Tempe, Arizona.

Schedule

Game summaries
In the season opener, Arizona State delivered a 12-0 road shutout victory over Whittier.  The Bulldogs produced a 26-0 shutout win against California Tech in their first ever home game at Goodwin Stadium.  Arizona State suffered an 18-0 shutout loss to Arizona in Tempe.  The Bulldogs were shutout for a second consecutive game, as they dropped a 19-0 road contest at Arizona State Teachers College at Flagstaff (ASTCF, later renamed Northern Arizona University).  Arizona State rebounded with a 7-6 home win over New Mexico.  The Bulldogs fell to New Mexico State 20-6 at Goodwin Stadium.  Arizona State was dealt a 33-6 road loss at San Jose State.  In the home finale, the Bulldogs dropped a 13-7 home game to ASTCF.  Arizona State closed the season with a 19-0 shutout victory against Texas-El Paso on the road.

Roster
The usual Arizona State lineup included left end Paul Guthrie, left tackle Al Dalmolin, left guard Buss Watts, center Bob Buntz, right guard Howard Wynn, right tackle Steve Setka, right end John Rouse, quarterback Bill Parry, halfbacks Howard Hooton and Glenn Shafer, and fullback Everett Jenkens.

Guy Acuff, Al Arivizu, Stanford Brimhall, Francis Clevenger, Jim Curtis, and Bennet Davis were also on the roster.

Awards
Left tackle Al Dalmolin earned All-Border Conference honors for the 1936 football season.

References

Arizona State
Arizona State Sun Devils football seasons
Arizona State Sun Devils football